Sir Charles Clore (26 December 1904 – 26 July 1979) was a British financier, retail and property magnate, and philanthropist.

Biography
Clore was of Lithuanian Jewish background, the son of Israel Clore, a Whitechapel tailor who had emigrated to London, and later to Israel. Charles Clore owned, through Sears Holdings, the British Shoe Corporation and Lewis's department stores (which included Selfridges), as well as investing heavily in property.

He owned Jowett Cars Ltd from 1945 to 1947 where he was known as "Santa Clore" for his much anticipated financial investment.

Sir Charles and his wife Francine had two children, Vivien and Alan Evelyn Clore. Clore Shipping Company had two oil tankers, the Vivien Louise and the Alan Evelyn.

Philanthropy
His philanthropic trust, since 2000 the Clore Duffield Foundation, is a donor to arts and Jewish community projects in Britain and abroad. The Clore Gallery at Tate Britain in London, which houses the world's largest collection of the works of J. M. W. Turner, was built in 1980–87 with £6 million from Clore and his daughter and £1.8 million from the British government. He was knighted in the 1971 Queen's Birthday Honours List for his philanthropic work.
Upon Sir Charles' death, Inland Revenue sued, claiming he was British domiciled (he had claimed Monaco domicile), in order to collect inheritance taxes. The court upheld the Inland Revenue position.

Legacy and commemoration

The beachfront Charles Clore Park in Tel Aviv is named after Clore. It stretches across 30 acres, and families use the seaside park to celebrate birthdays and host barbecues, or even attend city-wide events such as Tel Aviv Pride. His father, who died in 1933, is buried in nearby Petah Tikvah.

In September 1980 thieves stole 19 paintings from Clore's Monaco apartment, including works by Renoir, Monet, Pissarro and Utrillo. Clore's butler was found lying on the floor of the apartment after the theft, claiming that he had been attacked by the thieves, but was later found to have collaborated with them. The butler later committed suicide in Monaco's prison.
 
Clore was loosely connected to the Profumo affair, being a client of Christine Keeler. Clore was depicted in Andrew Lloyd-Webber's musical based on the affair, Stephen Ward the Musical. In 2014 Clore's daughter, Vivien Duffield, saw the musical with William Astor, whose father, William Astor, 3rd Viscount Astor, was also depicted. Clore owned several good racehorses, notably Valoris which won the Epsom Oaks in 1966.

References

See also
London Zoo: zoo exhibits funded by Charles Clore.
Charles Clore Park

1904 births
1979 deaths
Businesspeople from London
English expatriates in Monaco
English businesspeople in retailing
English philanthropists
English people of Lithuanian-Jewish descent
Knights Bachelor
British racehorse owners and breeders
20th-century British philanthropists
Burials at Willesden Jewish Cemetery
20th-century English businesspeople